Tenés Empanadas Graciela (short TEG) is a turn-based strategy game distributed by several popular Linux distributions. The idea for this free and open-source software program came from the board game TEG, which itself is based on the popular Risk game but differs in many aspects of the rules.

Gameplay
Using a Server several players can fight each other for world domination and of course also chat together. Various maps are used as battlefield and also several languages like Spanish, German, French and Polish are available.

History 
In 1996 the Argentine Ricardo "riq" Quesada started developing the game, and released it under the GNU GPL-2-0-only. He stopped working on it for a few years but brought the project back to life in early 2000. Some developers, graphic artists and translators joined the project located at SourceForge's servers and made it a success.

TEG was an early supporter of the FOSS multiplayer client-server system GGZ Gaming Zone.

Around 2014 the project moved from Sourceforge to GitHub.

Reception
"Tenés empanadas Graciela" was reviewed as a notable Risk clone several times by free and open-source software associated media outlets, such as in 2002 by the Linux Journal and Linux Magazine.
In 2007 Linux.com reviewed "Tenés empanadas Graciela" again as notable Risk clone. The Linux Game Tome lists the game with 4.2 of 5 stars.
The game was reviewed in 2012 by republica.com.

Versions and ports 
The game is widely distributed by several Linux distributions like Ubuntu, Debian, Gentoo Linux, Arch Linux and ported to other Operating Systems like macOS.

There is also an Argentine online version of the game called WebTeg which allows users to play with just a web browser.

See also 
 Lux, a series of proprietary Risk-clones that work on Linux.
 List of open source games

References

External links 
 TEG Old official page on SourceForge.net
 teg Official page on GitHub
 Web TEG

 Gagné, Marcel, (2002), "Networking for Pleasure" Linux Journal
 Greve, Georg CF, (2002), "Brave GNU World", Linux Magazine, Issue 22. (archived)

Linux games
Open-source video games
Strategy video games
Freeware games
MacOS games